Rose Glass is an English film director and screenwriter. She made her feature film debut with the 2019 psychological horror film Saint Maud, which was nominated for two awards at the 74th British Academy Film Awards. In 2020, Glass was named Best Debut Director at the British Independent Film Awards.

Early life
Glass was born in London and grew up in Essex. She attended the London College of Communication and is a graduate of the National Film and Television School.

Career
After directing the short film Room 55 in 2014, Glass achieved prominence with her feature length directorial and screenwriting debut, the psychological horror film Saint Maud. The story follows hospice nurse Maud who, having converted to Catholicism, becomes obsessed with one of her charges,  believing she must save her soul. Saint Maud premiered at the Toronto International Film Festival on 8 September 2019 and was released in the United Kingdom on 9 October 2020 by StudioCanal UK. The film was praised by critics for its direction, atmosphere, performances and score.

In 2019, Glass won the IWC Schaffhausen Filmmaker Bursary Award. In late 2020, Glass was nominated for and won Best Debut Director at the British Independent Film Awards. In early 2021, Saint Maud was nominated for two awards at the 74th British Academy Film Awards, including a nomination for Glass in the category of 'Outstanding Debut by a British Writer, Director or Producer'. In a five star review of Saint Maud, Film critic Mark Kermode called Glass "a thrilling new talent in British cinema". Noted Director Danny Boyle has called Glass "an extraordinary talent and powerful storyteller" with a "singular vision".

In March 2022, American actor Kristen Stewart announced that she would be working with Glass on her follow up to Saint Maud, a romantic thriller entitled Love Lies Bleeding, which will be developed by Film4 and A24.

Filmography

Feature films

Short films

References

Living people
Alumni of the National Film and Television School
English women film directors
Horror film directors
Film directors from London
Year of birth missing (living people)